Oceaniglobus is a Gram-negative and aerobic genus of bacteria from the family of Rhodobacteraceae with one known species (Oceaniglobus indicus). Oceaniglobus indicus has been isolated from seawater from the Indian Ocean.

References

Rhodobacteraceae
Bacteria genera
Monotypic bacteria genera